John Rawlins may refer to:

 John Aaron Rawlins (1831–1869), United States Army general during the American Civil War
 General John A. Rawlins, an 1874 public statue of Rawlins, in Washington, D.C.
 John Rawlins (director) (1902–1997), American film director
 John Rawlins (Royal Navy officer) (1922–2011), Royal Navy Medical officer and pioneer in diving medicine
 John Rawlins (MP) (by 1493–1532), for Gloucester
 John Rawlins (rugby union) (born 1957), Welsh rugby union player